The Geita Gold Mine is an open pit gold mine located in the Geita District of the Geita Region (formerly part of the Mwanza Region) of Tanzania.  It is operated by AngloGold Ashanti.

In 2008, the mine accounted for 6% of the company's overall annual gold production and employed close to 3,200 staff.

Early development (1930s)

Gold mining in Tanzania in modern times dates back to the German colonial period, beginning with gold discoveries near Lake Victoria in 1894. The first gold mine in what was then German East Africa, the Sekenke Gold Mine, began operation in 1909, and gold mining in Tanzania experienced a boom between 1930 and World War II.

In the 1930s Tanganyika Concessions learned that gold prospectors were having success in the area near Mgusu, southwest of Lake Victoria, and in 1934 formed Kentan Gold Area Limited to develop these finds.
It did so through its subsidiaries Saragura Development Company Limited and Geita Gold Mining Company Limited.
The Geita Gold Mining Company was set up to operate the Geita Gold Mine in Tanganyika, which was transferred to it from the Sagura Development Company.

Production began in 1936.
A 1937 report said it hoped to soon start crushing 500 tons per day, and could well become the largest gold producer in East Africa.
The company had built a road from the mine to Lake Victoria, where it had built a jetty.
It had built housing, medical facilities, set up a private wireless station and subsidized a weekly air service.
Gold milling began in Geita in December 1938.

Post-World War II (1945–1965) 

After World War II production was increased at Geita. By 1948 ore was recovered at three levels, processed in ball mills and gold recovered by the cyanide process. Ore was also recovered from a mine at Ridge Eight and carried 13 km to Geita by aerial ropeway. The General Manager and mine manager Art Sadler were Canadian; the company Secretary was Steve Charlton and the chief accountant Mildred Hayward. The company employed about 20 European specialists and 300 African miners. Electric power was provided from wood gasification plant feeding a Crossley engine giving 2 megawatt capacity. Gold was smelted and shipped monthly by road to Mwanza; in the rainy season the road became impassable and a DH Dragon was charted to collect the ingots from a rudimentary airstrip for transport to Dar es Salaam. Two prospectors were employed and ore samples assayed continuously by the lead/silver/acid process, A level of 6 dwt per ton was considered minimum economical level for recovery.
In 1951 an eight-inch pipeline was laid to bring water 15 miles from Lake Victoria.

In the early 1950s Geita employed about 2,000 men and produced more than half of the gold mined in Tanganyika, although this was much less than the peak production before World War II (1939–1945).
Geita struggled with financial problems until it closed in 1965, and seems to have been a net liability to TCL.
The mine produced over 1 million ounces of gold between 1936 and 1966.

By 1967, gold production in the country had dropped to insignificance but was revived in the mid-1970s, when the gold price rose once more. In the late 1990s, foreign mining companies started investing in the exploration and development of gold deposits in Tanzania, leading to the opening of a number of new mines.

Revival (2000 to present)

The Geita mine re-commenced production in 2000, initially as a joint venture of AngloGold and Ashanti. With the merger of the two companies in 2004, the mine became fully owned by AngloGold Ashanti. The mine was inaugurated by then-Tanzanian President Benjamin Mkapa, who pledged more incentives for investments in the sector. But the opening of the mine also raised fears within environmentalists from Tanzania and Uganda that its closeness to Lake Victoria, 20 kilometres away, could cause further environmental damage to the already affected water system. Unlike the North Mara Gold Mine, where a spill caused extremely high levels of arsenic, cadmium, cobalt, copper, chrome, nickel and zinc at the area around, at Geita the situation was found to be less acute. But at Geita, too, higher than natural levels of arsenic and other metals in sediments were found.

The mine started to experience production difficulties from 2007 onwards, starting with the failure of the highwall in the Nyankanga open pit, continued with some significant breakdowns of major mining equipment and in the process plant. Geita continued to underperform in 2009, producing 272,000 ounces of gold for the year, 43,000 short of the anticipated 315,000 ounces.

In March 2010, a gang of robbers stormed into the mine, tied up a security guard, seized his gun and stole 14 boxes of explosives. The police later managed to arrest one of the gang members and retrieved 12 of the 14 boxes but the incident raised questions in regards to the security at the mine.

At the end of September 2012, Charles Kitwanga, the deputy minister to the vice president’s office singled out the mine for its environmental efforts, citing it as a great example of how mines do not go hand in hand with pollution.
As of 2021 it was owned and operated by AngloGold Ashanti.

Production
Production figures of the recent past were:

References

Sources

External links
 AngloGold Ashanti website
 Geita mine (TZA-00057) Secretariat of the African, Caribbean and Pacific Group of States website

AngloGold Ashanti
Gold mines in Tanzania
Surface mines in Tanzania
Buildings and structures in the Mwanza Region
2000 establishments in Tanzania